Nimmo is a surname of Scottish origin. People with that name include:

 Alexander Nimmo (17831832), Scottish engineer and architect 
 Alison Nimmo (born 1964), Chief Executive of the Crown Estate
 Bill Nimmo (19172011), American television and radio personality
 Bob Nimmo (19222005), American military officer and politician
 Brad Nimmo (born 1959), Australian footballer
 Brandon Nimmo (born 1993), American baseball outfielder
 Derek Nimmo (193099), English character actor
 Dorothy Nimmo (19322001), British poet
 Emsley Nimmo (born 1953), Scottish Episcopalian priest
 Francis Nimmo (born before 1993), British planetary scientist
 Ian Nimmo (born 1985), Scottish rugby  player
 James Nimmo (191284), Australian public servant and policy maker
 Jenny Nimmo (born 1944), English author of children's books
 John Nimmo (disambiguation), multiple people
 Julie Wilson Nimmo (born 1974), Scottish actress
 Lance Nimmo (born 1982), American football player
 Les Nimmo (1897–1972), Australian politician
 Liam Nimmo (born 1984), English footballer
 Myra Nimmo (born 1954), Scottish athlete and academic
 Pamela Nimmo (born 1977), Scottish squash player
 Paul Nimmo (born 1973), Scottish theologian
 Robert Harold Nimmo (18931966), Australian soldier
 Stuart Lucian Nimmo (born 1946), British documentary maker and author
 Thomas Nimmo (1879-1943), Australian politician
 Vanessa Nimmo, South African contestant on Big Brother (British series 5)
 Willie Nimmo (1934–1991), Scottish footballer

See also
Nimmo (disambiguation)

sl:Nimmo